Vancouver-Burrard was a provincial electoral district for the Legislative Assembly of British Columbia, Canada. It first appeared on the hustings in the 1933 general election and included the neighbourhoods of Kitsilano and Fairview. This version of the riding was abolished in 1979, and its territory was divided between Vancouver-Point Grey, Vancouver-Little Mountain, and Vancouver Centre. 

In 1991, a new Vancouver-Burrard was established, containing the western half of the former Vancouver Centre. For the 2009 election, the riding was split across two new ridings. The portion west of Burrard, Georgia, and Jervis became the new Vancouver-West End riding. The remainder of Vancouver-Burrard joined part of Vancouver-Fairview to become the new Vancouver-False Creek riding.

Demographics 
From 2001 Canadian Census

Geography

History

MLAs 
Rosemary Brown, NDP (1972–1979)
Emery Barnes, NDP (1991–1996)
Tim Stevenson, NDP (1996–2001)
Lorne Mayencourt, Liberal (2001–2008)
Spencer Herbert, NDP (2008–2009)

Election results

External links 
BC Stats
Map of riding
Results of 2001 election (pdf)
2001 Expenditures (pdf)
Results of 1996 election
1996 Expenditures
Results of 1991 election
1991 Expenditures
Website of the Legislative Assembly of British Columbia
Website of the Vancouver-Burrard New Democrats

References 

Politics of Vancouver
Former provincial electoral districts of British Columbia